The 1977 European Judo Championships were the 26th edition of the European Judo Championships, and were held in Ludwigshafen, West Germany on 14 May 1977. Championships were subdivided into eight individual competitions, and a separate team competition. The separate European Women's Judo Championships were held in Arlon, Belgium, in October of the same year.

Medal overview

Individual

Teams

Medal table

References 

 Results of the 1977 European Judo Championships (JudoInside.com)

E
European Judo Championships
1977 in West German sport
Sport in Ludwigshafen
Judo competitions in Germany
International sports competitions hosted by West Germany
20th century in Ludwigshafen